SS Junius Smith was a Liberty ship built in the United States during World War II. She was named after Junius Smith, an American lawyer that founded the British and American Steam Navigation Company, who is often considered the "Father of the Atlantic Liner".

Construction
Junius Smith was laid down on 11 October 1944, under a Maritime Commission (MARCOM) contract, MC hull 2505, by the St. Johns River Shipbuilding Company, Jacksonville, Florida; she was sponsored by Mrs. Henry A. Davis, Jr., the wife of the foreman of railroad transportation at St. Johns River SBC, and was launched on 14 November 1944.

History
She was allocated to the Cosmopolitan Shipping Company, on 22 November 1944. On 14 April 1949, she was laid up in the National Defense Reserve Fleet, Beaumont, Texas. She was sold for scrapping, 30 November 1965, to Southern Scrap Material Co., Ltd., for $48,929.79. She was removed from the fleet, 14 January 1966.

References

Bibliography

 
 
 
 

 

Liberty ships
Ships built in Jacksonville, Florida
1944 ships
Beaumont Reserve Fleet